The Quxian Formation is a Santonian to Campanian geologic formation in China.  Fossil dinosaur eggs have been reported from the formation. It is a unit of the Qujiang Group and dates to the Santonian through early Campanian.

See also 
 List of dinosaur-bearing rock formations
 List of stratigraphic units with dinosaur trace fossils
 Dinosaur eggs

References

Bibliography

Further reading 
 N. J. Mateer. 1986. Dinosaur eggs from the Upper Cretaceous of Zhejiang Province, China. In D. D. Gillette (ed.), First International Symposium on Dinosaur Tracks and Traces, Abstracts with Program 20

Geologic formations of China
Upper Cretaceous Series of Asia
Cretaceous China
Campanian Stage
Santonian Stage
Sandstone formations
Conglomerate formations
Ooliferous formations
Alluvial deposits
Paleontology in Zhejiang